Ernesto Celli (1895 – 1925) was an Argentine footballer. He played in six matches for the Argentina national football team from 1919 to 1924. He was also part of Argentina's squad for the 1922 South American Championship.

References

External links
 

1895 births
1925 deaths
Argentine footballers
Argentina international footballers
Place of birth missing
Association football midfielders
Newell's Old Boys footballers